The Kansas Department for Aging and Disability Services is the second-largest state government agency in Kansas. It is responsible for administering services to older adults, managing the four state hospitals and institutions, and directing health occupations credentialing. The agency was formed on July 1, 2012 as a result of Governor Sam Brownback's executive order that merged the Department of Aging with divisions of the Department for Social and Rehabilitation Services and the Department of Health and Environment.

References

External links
Kansas Department for Aging and Disability Services website
Kansas Department for Aging and Disability Services publications at KGI Online Library State Library of Kansas

Aging and Disability Services
Government agencies established in 2012
2012 establishments in Kansas